Caroline Carver (born 1976) is an English actress, screenwriter, and producer best known for roles such as Princess Jessica in the TV film The Magical Legend of the Leprechauns (1999), Ingrid in The Aryan Couple (2004), and Sandy in My First Wedding (2006).

Career
Carver played the young adult Hattie in the film Tom's Midnight Garden (1999) based on the book of the same name, alongside Anthony Way and Joan Plowright. Early film work also includes The Magical Legend of the Leprechauns (1999).

Her television work has ranged from costume drama, such as Sharpe's Peril; modern drama, including Spooks, Jonathan Creek and Rosemary & Thyme; to medical drama in the shape of Holby City and Doctors. She won a Royal Television Society Best Actress Award for her performance in The Scarlet Pimpernel series, opposite Richard E. Grant.

On stage, in 2013 she played the role of Mandy in The Full Monty on tour. She reprised the role in the West End in 2014.

She wrote and produced the award-winning short film You Me and Captain Longbridge (2008).

Screen credits
City Central, A Night on the Town (1998) - Alison
A Rather English Marriage (1998) - Young Grace
The Last Train (1999) - Hild 
The Magical Legend of the Leprechauns (1999) - Princess Jessica
Tom's Midnight Garden (1999) - Hatty
The Scarlet Pimpernel, A Good Name (2000) - Claudette de Bridoire 
Alone (2001) - Sarah
Murder Rooms: The Dark Beginnings of Sherlock Holmes, The Kingdom of Bones (2001) - Gladys Donovan 
Animated Tales of the World, Ewenn Congar: a Story from France (2001) - Ines (voice) 
The Inspector Lynley Mysteries, A Great Deliverance (2001) - Danny 
In a Land of Plenty (2001) - Zoe
Jeffrey Archer: The Truth (2002) - Secretary
Holby City (2003) - Sonia Shaw
Jonathan Creek (2003) - Sally Ellen Oakley
The Aryan Couple (2004) - Ingrid Vassman
Spooks (2004) - Catherine Townsend 
Rosemary & Thyme, 'The Gongoozlers' (2004) - Penny Patterson 
George and the Dragon (2004) - Sister Angela 
My First Wedding (2004) - Sandy
goldfish (2007) - Claire
Sharpe's Peril (2008) - Mrs Tredinnick 
The Royal Today (2008) - Heather Dunstan
Doctors (2009) - Elaine Lenton
Irreversi (2009) - Terry
New Tricks (2010) - Helen Vestry

References

External links

1976 births
Living people
English film actresses
English television actresses
English voice actresses
Actresses from Manchester